Baron Strange is a title which has been created four times in the Peerage of England. Two creations, one in 1295 and another in 1326, had only one holder each, upon whose deaths they became extinct. Two of the creations, that of 1299 and that of 1628, are extant. The surname Le Strange was Latinized as Extraneus (i.e. "Foreigner, Stranger"). The arms of Le Strange of Knockin Castle in Shropshire were: Gules, two lions passant argent.

All four baronies of Strange were created by writ, which means that they can also pass through female lines. 
Following  the passing of the  Peerage Act 1963, Elizabeth Frances Philipps, 14th Baroness Strange (of the 1299 creation), became the first female to take her seat in the House of Lords by virtue of an hereditary peerage.

1295 creation
The first creation came in 1295 when Roger le Strange "of Salop." (i.e. Shropshire) was summoned to the Model Parliament by writ addressed to Rogero Extraneo, by which he is deemed to have become Lord Strange. He was a younger son of John le Strange III of Knockin Castle in Shropshire, Sheriff of Shropshire and Staffordshire in 1236. On his death in 1311 the title became extinct.

1299 creation
The second creation came in 1299 when John le Strange V was summoned to the House of Lords by a writ directed to Johanni Lestraunge de Knokyn, by which he is deemed to have become Lord Strange. This creation is referred to as Baron Strange de Knokyn or Baron Strange of Knokyn (aliter Knokin or Knockin, etc.), named after his seat of Knockin Castle in Shropshire, which thus distinguishes it from the earlier 1295 barony, which was still extant on its creation. He was the eldest son and heir of John le Strange IV of Knockin, the eldest son of John le Strange III of Knockin, and was therefore the nephew of the baron of the 1295 creation. Hamon Le Strange, younger brother of the 2nd Baron, founded the family of Le Strange of Hunstanton, Norfolk (which ancestral manor was given to him by the 2nd Baron in 1309), and bore his paternal arms differenced by a bendlet sable. (See L'Estrange baronets of Hunstanton, created in 1629, which male line continued until 1762)). Joan le Strange, suo jure 9th Baroness, daughter and heiress of the 8th Baron who died without male issue, married George Stanley, 9th Baron Strange, son of Thomas Stanley, 1st Earl of Derby, who was summoned to Parliament as Lord Strange in her right. Her son Thomas Stanley succeeded as both 2nd Earl of Derby and 10th Baron Strange.

The titles remained united until the death of his great-grandson, the fifth Earl and 13th Baron, in 1594. The earldom was inherited by his younger brother, the sixth Earl, while the barony of Strange (as well as the baronies of Mohun of Dunster and Stanley, also held by the Earl) fell into abeyance between the late Earl's three daughters Lady Anne, Lady Frances and Lady Elizabeth (however, the sixth Earl of Derby erroneously assumed the barony of Strange - see below). The barony of Strange remained in abeyance for the next 327 years.

However, the abeyance was terminated in 1921 in favour of Elizabeth Frances Philipps, Viscountess St Davids, who became the fourteenth Baroness. She was the second wife of John Philipps, 1st Viscount St Davids. The abeyance of the ancient baronies of Hungerford and de Moleyns was terminated at the same time in her favour. On 31 July 1963, the Peerage Act 1963 came into effect, which, among other things, enabled women to sit and vote in the House of Lords by virtue of an hereditary peerage. Following the passage of the Act, Lady St Davids applied for a writ of summons to the House of Lords in right of her Strange barony, which was subsequently issued to her, and she took her seat in the House on 19 November 1963 as the first female peer to do so under the provision of the Peerage Act 1963. On her death in 1974 the titles were inherited by her son, the fifteenth Baron Strange, who had already succeeded his father as second Viscount St Davids. As of 2013 the titles are held by the second Viscount's grandson, the fourth Viscount and seventeenth Baron Strange.

1326 creation
The third creation came in 1326 when Sir Eubulus le Strange was summoned to Parliament as Lord Strange. However, the title became extinct on his death in 1335. His nephew Roger le Strange, 4th Baron Strange of Knockyn, was his heir.

1628 creation
In 1594 William Stanley, 6th Earl of Derby (1561-1642), following the death of his elder brother the 5th Earl of Derby, incorrectly assumed the title Baron Strange (created in 1299) (see above). In 1628 his son and heir apparent, James Stanley, 7th Earl of Derby, was summoned to the House of Lords through a writ of acceleration as Lord Strange. When it was discovered that his father's assumption of the barony was erroneous, it was deemed that there were two baronies of Strange, one created in 1299 then in abeyance, and another created "accidentally" in 1628. James Stanley later succeeded his father as 7th Earl of Derby.

The titles remained united until the death of his grandson, the ninth Earl and third Baron, in 1702. The earldom was inherited by the late Earl's younger brother, the tenth Earl, while the barony fell into abeyance between the Earl's two daughters, Lady Henrietta and Lady Elizabeth. On Lady Elizabeth's death in 1714 the abeyance was terminated in favour of Henrietta, who became the fourth Baroness. She married, firstly, John Annesley, 4th Earl of Anglesey, and after his death, secondly, John Ashburnham, 1st Earl of Ashburnham. Lady Strange was succeeded by her daughter from her second marriage, Henrietta Bridget, the fifth Baroness. However, she died unmarried at an early age and was succeeded by her aforementioned great-uncle, the tenth Earl of Derby, who became the sixth Baron Strange.

Lord Derby was childless and was succeeded in the barony by his first cousin once removed James Murray, 2nd Duke of Atholl, who became the seventh Baron Strange as well. He was the grandson of Lady Amelia Anne Sophia Stanley, daughter of James Stanley, 7th Earl of Derby. On his death the dukedom and barony separated. He was succeeded in the dukedom by his nephew John Murray, 3rd Duke of Atholl, while the barony passed to his daughter Charlotte, the eighth Baroness. She married her first cousin, the third Duke of Atholl. They were both succeeded by their son, the fourth Duke and ninth Baron. In 1786 he was created Earl Strange and Baron Murray of Stanley in the Peerage of Great Britain. The dukedom and barony remained united until the death of his great-great-grandson, the ninth Duke and fourteenth Baron, in 1957 (see the Duke of Atholl for more detailed information on the holders during this period and for later history of the title).

The barony of Strange fell into abeyance between the representatives of the three daughters of the fourth Duke of Atholl, Lady Charlotte, Lady Amelia Sophia and Lady Elizabeth. The abeyance was terminated by the Queen in 1965 in favour of John Drummond of Megginch, who became the fifteenth Baron. He was the great-grandson of Lady Charlotte and her second husband Admiral Sir Adam Drummond of Megginch. However, on his death in 1982 the peerage once again fell into abeyance, this time between his three daughters. It was called out of abeyance in 1986 in favour of the eldest daughter, Cherry, who became the sixteenth Baroness. She was the wife of Captain Humphrey ap Evans (1922–2009), who along with his wife assumed the name of Drummond of Megginch by decree of the Lord Lyon in 1965. Lady Strange was one of the ninety hereditary peers that were allowed to remain in the House of Lords after the passing of the House of Lords Act 1999. On her death in 2005 the title was inherited by her eldest son, the seventeenth and  present holder of the title.

The family seat was Megginch Castle, near Errol, Perthshire.

Barons Strange, First Creation (1295)
Roger le Strange, 1st Baron Strange (d. 1311)

Barons Strange (de/of Knockin), Second Creation (1299)

John le Strange V, 1st Baron Strange (c. 1254–1309)
John le Strange VI, 2nd Baron Strange (c. 1282–1311)
John le Strange, 3rd Baron Strange (c. 1297–1323)
Roger le Strange, 4th Baron Strange (1301–1349), son of the 2nd Baron
Roger le Strange, 5th Baron Strange (c. 1327–1382)
John le Strange, 6th Baron Strange (c. 1350–1397)
Richard le Strange, 7th Baron Strange (1381–1449), who married Elizabeth Cobham, sister of Eleanor, Duchess of Gloucester
John le Strange, 8th Baron Strange (c. 1440–1477), who married Jacquetta Woodville, the sister of Elizabeth Woodville, queen consort of England
Joan le Strange, 9th Baroness Strange (c. 1460–1514)
George Stanley, 9th Baron Strange (jure uxoris) (1460–1503)

Thomas Stanley, 2nd Earl of Derby, 10th Baron Strange (d. 1521)
Edward Stanley, 3rd Earl of Derby, 11th Baron Strange (c. 1508–1572)
Henry Stanley, 4th Earl of Derby, 12th Baron Strange (1531–1593)
Ferdinando Stanley, 5th Earl of Derby, 13th Baron Strange (1559–1594) (abeyant 1594)
Elizabeth Frances Philipps, 14th Baroness Strange (1884–1974) (abeyance terminated 1921)
Jestyn Reginald Austen Plantagenet Philipps, 2nd Viscount St Davids, 15th Baron Strange (1917–1991)
Colwyn Jestyn John Philipps, 3rd Viscount St Davids, 16th Baron Strange (1939–2009)
Rhodri Colwyn Philipps, 4th Viscount St Davids, 17th Baron Strange (b. 1966)

Barons Strange, Third Creation (1326)
Eubulus le Strange, 1st Baron Strange (died 1335)

Barons Strange, Fourth Creation (1628)
This barony was created by clerical error in 1628, confusing Lord Derby with the claimant of the older Barony Strange of Knockin (created in 1299). See Baronies created by error for details.
James Stanley, 7th Earl of Derby, 1st Baron Strange (1607–1651)
Charles Stanley, 8th Earl of Derby, 2nd Baron Strange (1628–1672)
William Richard George Stanley, 9th Earl of Derby, 3rd Baron Strange (1655–1702) (abeyant 1702)
Henrietta Stanley, 4th Baroness Strange (d. 1718) (became sole heir 1714)
Henrietta Ashburnham, 5th Baroness Strange (d. 1732)
James Stanley, 10th Earl of Derby, 6th Baron Strange (1664–1736)
James Murray, 2nd Duke of Atholl, 7th Baron Strange (1690–1764)
Charlotte Murray, 8th Baroness Strange, Duchess consort of Atholl (c. 1731–1805)
John Murray, 4th Duke of Atholl, 9th Baron Strange (1755–1830)
John Murray, 5th Duke of Atholl, 10th Baron Strange (1778–1846)
George Augustus Frederick John Murray, 6th Duke of Atholl, 11th Baron Strange (1814–1864)
John James Hugh Henry Stewart-Murray, 7th Duke of Atholl, 12th Baron Strange (1840–1917)
John George Stewart-Murray, 8th Duke of Atholl, 13th Baron Strange (1871–1942)
James Thomas Stewart-Murray, 9th Duke of Atholl, 14th Baron Strange (1879–1957) (abeyant 1957)
John Drummond, 15th Baron Strange (1900–1982) (abeyance terminated 1965; abeyant 1982)
(Jean) Cherry Drummond of Megginch, 16th Baroness Strange (1928–2005) (abeyance terminated 1986)
Adam Humphrey Drummond of Megginch, 17th Baron Strange (b. 1953)

The heir apparent is the present holder's son Hon. John Adam Humphrey Drummond (b. 1992).

The style Lord Strange was used as a courtesy title by the Earls of Derby until James Stanley, Lord Strange (1716–1771), Chancellor of the Duchy of Lancaster;  he was the son of Edward Stanley, 11th Earl of Derby, who (unlike his 6th cousin, the 10th Earl) did not hold the barony of Strange (it having passed to the Murray family). Nowadays the Earls of Derby use the courtesy title of Lord Stanley for heirs apparent.

See also
Earl of Derby
Viscount St Davids
Duke of Atholl
Baron Strange de Blackmere

Notes

References

External links
 Captain Humphrey Drummond of Megginch - Daily Telegraph obituary

Baronies in the Peerage of England
Extinct baronies in the Peerage of England
Baronies created by error
Baronies by writ
Stanley family
1295 establishments in England
Noble titles created in 1295
Noble titles created in 1299
Noble titles created in 1325
Noble titles created in 1628
Peerages created for eldest sons of peers
 
Le Strange family